Walsa (Quechua for raft, Hispanicized spelling Balsa (Spanish for raft, from Quechua) is a  mountain in the Andes of Peru. It is located in the Junín Region, Huancayo Province, Chongos Alto District. Walsa lies west of Kapillayuq between the lakes Ñawinqucha in the east and Walsaqucha in the northwest.

References

Mountains of Junín Region
Mountains of Peru